All Souls Church, Unitarian is a Unitarian Universalist church located at 1500 Harvard Street NW at the intersection of 16th Street, Washington, D.C., roughly where the Mt. Pleasant, Columbia Heights, and Adams Morgan neighborhoods of the city meet. The design of its current building, completed in 1924, is based on St. Martin's-in-the-Fields in London. It was listed on the National Register of Historic Places in 2020. All Souls, a member of the Unitarian Universalist Association of Congregations, describes its theology as having evolved from a liberal Christian tradition into a "rich pluralism."

History

Nineteenth century 
All Souls was founded in 1821 as the First Unitarian Church of Washington; among the church's founding members were President John Quincy Adams, Vice President John C. Calhoun, and Charles Bulfinch (who designed the original church building at 6th and D Streets NW and more famously the United States Capitol). The All Souls bell was cast in 1822 by Joseph Revere, the son of Paul; this bell, paid for with contributions by, among others, President James Monroe, originally served as a quasi-official town bell for Washington, DC.

The church has a long tradition of promoting liberal religious views and social justice issues.  In the first half of the 19th century, it was known for its opposition to slavery, and counts among its past ministers the prominent abolitionist William Henry Channing.

William Henry Channing gave a sermon on the morning of February 8, 1863 at the Unitarian Church, which was still located on the corner of 6th and D Streets Northwest.  Later that evening abolitionist and women's rights activist John Celivergos Zachos gave a prominent sermon to the Freedman of the Southern States.  The subject was entitled  "The Unity of the Human Race" with a special reference to the Freedman of South Carolina.

In 1877 the congregation changed its name to All Souls Church, a reflection of the words of William Ellery Channing, founding father of Unitarian Universalism (and uncle of Willam Henry Channing): "I am a member of the living family of all souls."

Twentieth century 
In 1944 All Souls called A. Powell Davies to be its minister. Davies became nationally prominent for his progressive views, advocating civil rights for African-Americans and women, desegregation, and for keeping control of nuclear weapons in civilian hands. It was during Davies' tenure that All Souls organized a large shipment of school supplies for the children survivors of the nuclear attacks on Hiroshima and Nagasaki. During this period, All Souls also founded the first desegregated boys' club in the city, in response to the Police Boys' Club's reluctance to desegregate. Davies' popular ministry caused explosive growth both at All Souls and also in the formation of new Unitarian churches in the Washington, D.C. area, starting with the Unitarian Church of Arlington and followed closely by the Mount Vernon Unitarian Church and the Unitarian Universalist Congregation of Fairfax.

James Reeb, a martyr of the Civil Rights Movement, was Assistant Minister at All Souls prior to his murder at Selma, Alabama in 1965.  All Souls' progressive vision continued through the 1970s and 1980s as well, under the Rev. David Hilliard Eaton, the church's first African-American senior minister.  Documents obtained through the Freedom of Information Act revealed that J. Edgar Hoover was so deeply distrustful of the direction in which Eaton was leading All Souls that he planted an undercover FBI agent in the church to monitor the congregation and undermine Eaton's ministry.

All Souls has been performing interracial and same-sex weddings for decades.

New millennium 
On the evening of September 11, 2001, All Souls and its newly called senior minister, Robert M. Hardies, held a memorial service which was covered by National Public Radio. Soon thereafter, All Souls hosted a public memorial service for Joseph Curseen Jr. and Thomas Morris Jr., two local postal workers who died from anthrax exposure.  It was recently the site of a large conference of religious liberals and progressives, and on June 5, 2006, Rev. Hardies was shown speaking against the Federal Marriage Amendment in a clip from a National Press Club news conference on CNN's The Situation Room .  On December 18, 2009 at All Souls Church, mayor Adrian Fenty signed into law the "Religious Freedom and Civil Marriage Equality Amendment Act of 2009", which made same-sex marriage legal in Washington, D.C.  Rev. Hardies resigned from All Souls in June 2020.  All Souls currently has an Interim Senior Minister, the Rev. Kathleen Rolenz.  By Fall 2023, All Souls is expected to call their next minister or ministry team.

Engagement

Music 
All Souls has two primary choirs: The All Souls Choir, and the Jubilee Singers.

The Charlie Byrd and Stan Getz album Jazz Samba was recorded on 13 February 1962 in Pierce Hall at All Souls.

Social justice 
Civil Rights activist Lillian Smith delivered "The Mob and the Ghost" on September 2, 1961.

Activist Angela Davis spoke at All Souls in 1974.

Members 
Prominent members of All Souls have included President and Chief Justice William Howard Taft, Associate Justice Wiley B. Rutledge, the Hon. Hilda Mason, former D.C. mayor Marion Barry, mezzosoprano Denyce Graves, and Sweet Honey in the Rock member Ysaye Maria Barnwell.

References

External links

All Souls Church, Unitarian Home Page
Biography of A. Powell Davies

Unitarian Universalist churches in Washington, D.C.
Churches completed in 1924
20th-century Unitarian Universalist church buildings
Religious organizations established in 1821
1821 establishments in Washington, D.C.
Georgian Revival architecture in Washington, D.C.
Presidential churches in the United States
Churches on the National Register of Historic Places in Washington, D.C.